Diffusion pumps use a high speed jet of vapor to direct gas molecules in the pump throat down into the bottom of the pump and out the exhaust. They were the first type of high vacuum pumps operating in the regime of free molecular flow, where the movement of the gas molecules can be better understood as diffusion than by conventional fluid dynamics. Invented in 1915 by Wolfgang Gaede, he named it a diffusion pump since his design was based on the finding that gas cannot diffuse against the vapor stream, but will be carried with it to the exhaust. However, the principle of operation might be more precisely described as gas-jet pump, since diffusion plays a role also in other high vacuum pumps. In modern textbooks, the diffusion pump is categorized as a momentum transfer pump.

The diffusion pump is widely used in both industrial and research applications. Most modern diffusion pumps use silicone oil or polyphenyl ethers as the working fluid.

History
In the late 19th century, most vacuums were created using a Sprengel pump, which had the advantage of being very simple to operate, and capable of achieving quite good vacuum given enough time. Compared to later pumps, however, the pumping speed was very slow and the vapor pressure of the liquid mercury limited the ultimate vacuum.

Following his invention of the molecular pump, the diffusion pump was invented in 1915 by Wolfgang Gaede, and originally used elemental mercury as the working fluid. After its invention, the design was quickly commercialized by Leybold.

It was then improved by Irving Langmuir and W. Crawford. Cecil Reginald Burch discovered the possibility of using silicone oil in 1928.

Oil diffusion pumps

An oil diffusion pump is used to achieve higher vacuum (lower pressure) than is possible by use of positive displacement pumps alone. Although its use has been mainly associated within the high-vacuum range, down to
, diffusion pumps today can produce pressures approaching
 when properly used with modern fluids and accessories. The features that make the diffusion pump attractive for high and ultra-high vacuum use are its high pumping speed for all gases and low cost per unit pumping speed when compared with other types of pump used in the same vacuum range. Diffusion pumps cannot discharge directly into the atmosphere, so a mechanical forepump is typically used to maintain an outlet pressure around
.

The oil diffusion pump is operated with an oil of low vapor pressure. The high speed jet is generated by boiling the fluid and directing the vapor through a jet assembly. Note that the oil is gaseous when entering the nozzles. Within the nozzles, the flow changes from laminar to supersonic and molecular. Often, several jets are used in series to enhance the pumping action. The outside of the diffusion pump is cooled using either air flow, water lines or a water-filled jacket. As the vapor jet hits the outer cooled shell of the diffusion pump, the working fluid condenses and is recovered and directed back to the boiler. The pumped gases continue flowing to the base of the pump at increased pressure, flowing out through the diffusion pump outlet, where they are compressed to ambient pressure by the secondary mechanical forepump and exhausted.

Unlike turbomolecular pumps and cryopumps, diffusion pumps have no moving parts and as a result are quite durable and reliable. They can function over pressure ranges of
. They are driven only by convection and thus have a very low energy efficiency.

One major disadvantage of diffusion pumps is the tendency to backstream oil into the vacuum chamber. This oil can contaminate surfaces inside the chamber or upon contact with hot filaments or electrical discharges may result in carbonaceous or siliceous deposits. Due to backstreaming, oil diffusion pumps are not suitable for use with highly sensitive analytical equipment or other applications which require an extremely clean vacuum environment, but mercury diffusion pumps may be in the case of ultra high vacuum chambers used for metal deposition. Often cold traps and baffles are used to minimize backstreaming, although this results in some loss of pumping speed.

The oil of a diffusion pump cannot be exposed to the atmosphere when hot. If this occurs, the oil will oxidise and has to be replaced. If a fire occurs, the smoke and residue may contaminate other parts of the system.

Oil types

The least expensive diffusion pump oils are based on hydrocarbons which have been purified by double-distillation. Compared with the other fluids, they have higher vapor pressure, so are usually limited to a pressure of
. They are also the most likely to burn or explode if exposed to oxidizers.

The most common silicone oils used in diffusion pumps are trisiloxanes, which contain the chemical group Si-O-Si-O-Si, to which various phenyl groups or methyl groups are attached. These are available as the so called 702 and 703 blends, which were formerly manufactured by Dow Corning. These can be further separated into 704 and 705 oils, which are made up of the isomers of  tetraphenyl tetramethyl trisiloxane and pentaphenyl trimethyl trisiloxane respectively.

For pumping reactive species, usually a polyphenyl ether based oil is used. These oils are the most chemical and heat resistant type of diffusion pump oil.

Steam ejectors

  
 
The steam ejector is a popular form of pump for vacuum distillation and freeze-drying. A jet of steam entrains the vapour that must be removed from the vacuum chamber. Steam ejectors can have single or multiple stages, with and without condensers in between the stages. While both steam ejectors and diffusion pumps use jets of vapor to entrain gas, they work on fundamentally different principles - steam ejectors rely on viscous flow and mixing to pump gas, whereas diffusion pumps use molecular diffusion. This has several consequences. In diffusion pumps, the inlet pressure can be much lower than the static pressure of jet, whereas in steam ejectors the two pressures are about the same. Also, diffusion pumps are capable of much higher compression ratios, and cannot discharge directly to atmosphere.

See also 
 Turbomolecular pump
 Vacuum pump
 Aspirator (pump)

References

External links
 An oil diffusion pump built from glass by the Arizona State University Main

Further reading
 

Vacuum pumps